The Massachusetts Government Act (14 Geo. 3 c. 45) was passed by the Parliament of Great Britain, receiving royal assent on 20 May 1774. The act effectively abrogated the 1691 charter of the Province of Massachusetts Bay and gave its royally-appointed governor wide-ranging powers. The colonists said that it altered, by parliamentary fiat, the basic structure of colonial government, vehemently opposed it, and would not let it operate. The act was a major step on the way to the start of the American Revolution in 1775.

Background
The Act is one of the Intolerable Acts (also known as Repressive Acts and Coercive Acts), which were designed to suppress dissent and restore order in Massachusetts. In the wake of the Boston Tea Party, the British Parliament launched a legislative offensive against Massachusetts to control its errant behavior. British officials believed that their inability to control Massachusetts was partly rooted in the highly-independent nature of its local government. On May 2, 1774, Lord North, speaking as the head of the ministry, called on Parliament to adopt the Act on the ground that the whole colony was "in a distempered state of disturbance and opposition to the laws of the mother country."

Contents
The Massachusetts Government Act abrogated the colony's charter and provided for a greater amount of royal control. Massachusetts had been unique among the colonies in its ability to elect members of its executive council. The act took away that right and instead gave the king the sole power to appoint and dismiss the council. Additionally, many civil offices that had been chosen by election were now to be appointed by the royal governor. Town meetings were forbidden without consent of the governor. As Lord North explained to Parliament, the purpose of the act was "to take the executive power from the hands of the democratic part of government."

Governor
Power was centralized in the hands of the royal governor, and historic rights to self-government were abrogated.  The Act provided that local officials were no longer to be elected:
 [The] governor, to nominate and appoint... and also to remove, without the consent of the council, all judges of the inferior courts of common pleas, commissioners of Oyer and Terminer, the attorney general, provosts, marshals, justices of the peace, and other officers... and nominate and appoint the sheriffs without the consent of the council.

Most important was the provision regarding town meetings, the key instrument of local rule:
 whereas a great abuse has been made of the power of calling such meetings, and the inhabitants have, contrary to the design of their institution, been misled to treat upon matters of the most general concern, and to pass many dangerous and unwarrantable resolves: for remedy whereof, be it enacted... no meeting shall be called... without the leave of the governor, [apart from one annual election meeting].

Implementation
When Governor Thomas Gage invoked the act in October 1774 to dissolve the provincial assembly, its Patriot leaders responded by setting up an alternative government that actually controlled everything outside Boston.  They argued that the new act had nullified the contract between the king and the people, who ignored Gage's order for new elections and set up the Massachusetts Provincial Congress. It acted as the province's (from 1776 the state's)  government until the 1780 adoption of the Massachusetts State Constitution. The governor had control only in Boston, where his soldiers were based.

Parliament repealed the act in 1778 as part of attempts to reach a diplomatic end to the ongoing American Revolutionary War.

See also
Colonial government in the Thirteen Colonies

Notes

Further reading
 Raphael, Ray. The First American Revolution: Before Lexington and Concord (2011)  excerpt
 Sosin, Jack M. "The Massachusetts Acts of 1774: Coercive or Preventive?." Huntington Library Quarterly (1963): 235–252. in JSTOR
 Walett, Francis G. "The Massachusetts Council, 1766-1774: The Transformation of a Conservative Institution." William and Mary Quarterly (1949): 605–627. in JSTOR

External links
 complete text of Act
 http://www.lexrex.com/enlightened/laws/intolerable.htm

Legal history of Massachusetts
1774 in Massachusetts
Massachusetts in the American Revolution
Laws leading to the American Revolution
Great Britain Acts of Parliament 1774
Pre-statehood history of Massachusetts